Brian Gregg (born June 27, 1984) is an  American cross-country skier. Gregg competed at the 2014 Winter Olympics in Sochi, Russia.

Personal life
Since May 21, 2011 Brian is married to fellow cross country skier Caitlin Compton.

References

External links 
 
 
 
 

1984 births
Living people
American male cross-country skiers
Cross-country skiers at the 2014 Winter Olympics
Olympic cross-country skiers of the United States